Angels One Five is a 1952 British war film directed by George More O'Ferrall and starring Jack Hawkins, Michael Denison, Dulcie Gray, John Gregson, Cyril Raymond and Veronica Hurst. Based on the book What Are Your Angels Now? by Pelham Groom (who was also technical adviser to the film under his full title of W/Cdr. A. J. C. Pelham Groom), the plot centres on a young fighter pilot immediately before and during the Battle of Britain in the Second World War. Some scenes in the film were shot at RAF Uxbridge, where there was a wartime operations room.

"Angels One Five" refers to RAF radio procedure from the Second World War. Angels stands for altitude. One Five means 15,000 feet. The film was the first British post-war production to deal with the Battle of Britain.

Plot
In 1940, a replacement, Pilot Officer T. B. "Septic" Baird (John Gregson), is landing his Hawker Hurricane at "Pimpernel" Squadron's airfield. Just as he touches down, a damaged aircraft from an earlier mission taxis across his path. Septic's quick reactions allow him to "leapfrog" the other Hurricane, averting a costly disaster but he crashes his replacement aircraft into the bungalow of Squadron Leader Barry Clinton (Cyril Raymond) at the end of the runway.

This earns Septic the wrath of his new squadron leader, Bill Ponsford (Andrew Osborn), because he damaged a replacement aircraft. The crash also injures the ligaments in Septic's neck, which he is able to self-diagnose, as he had been a medical student before the war. The next morning, Septic is told by Group Captain "Tiger" Small (Jack Hawkins) that he will not be able to fly until his neck is healed, so he will instead serve in the operations room.

Several days later, with the risk of a bombing raid on the airfield and all of Pimpernel Squadron's Hurricanes scrambled, Tiger orders all aircraft to take off and fly out of harm's way until the raid is over. With Tiger quickly assembling all available pilots and finding aircraft to fly, Septic wins a foot race with Small to claim the last spare Hurricane for himself. He then proceeds to shoot down a Messerschmitt Bf 110 from the attacking force. His delight is short-lived when he is admonished by Small and Sqn Ldr Peter Moon (Michael Denison) for leaving his radio set on transmit, preventing the returning Hurricanes from being warned to divert to an undamaged airfield. A crestfallen Septic returns to his ground duties.

Eventually, a reinstated Septic joins in Pimpernel's operations but he is mortally wounded while shooting down a German aircraft. His last words are heard over the Sector control room tannoy (public-address system), when he tells Small that their planned return foot race will have to be "postponed indefinitely". Small replies "Your message received and understood. Out". The final shot is of Squadron Leader Clinton's wife Nadine (Dulcie Gray) hanging an oil lamp in the ruins of their bungalow to aid returning pilots.

Cast

 Jack Hawkins as Group Captain 'Tiger' Small
 Michael Denison as Squadron Leader Peter Moon
 Dulcie Gray as Nadine Clinton
 John Gregson as Pilot Officer 'Septic' Baird
 Cyril Raymond as Squadron Leader Barry Clinton
 Veronica Hurst as Betty Carfax
 Humphrey Lestocq as Flight Lieutenant "Batchy" Salter
 Harold Goodwin as A.C. 2 Wailes
 Norman Pierce as 'Bonzo'
 Geoffrey Keen as Company Sergeant Major (Army Guard Section)
 Harry Locke as Look Out
 John Harvey as SWO (Station Warrant Officer)
 Philip Stainton as Police Constable
 Vida Hope as W.A.A.F.
 Amy Veness as Aunt Tabitha
 Ronald Adam as Group Controller
 Andrew Osborn as Squadron Leader Bill Ponsford
 Ewan Roberts as Medical Officer
 Peter Jones as Operations Room Sentry
 John Phillips as Engineering Officer
 John Sharp as 'Boss'
 Joan Sterndale-Bennett as W.A.A.F.
 Colin Tapley as Adjutant
 Terence Longdon as Falk - Pimpernel Pilot
 Russell Hunter as Raines - Pimpernel Pilot
 Harold Siddons as Mortimer - Pimpernel Pilot
 Victor Maddern as Airman
 Harry Fowler as Airman
 Gordon Bell as "Ops B"
 Sam Kydd as Mess Waiter

Production
Angels One Five featured three Hawker Hurricane fighter aircraft: Hurricane Mk. Is (p2617 and L1592) on loan from the RAF and Hurricane Mk. IIc (LF363) loaned by Hawker Aircraft. An additional five Hurricane Mk. IIc aircraft (N ° 544, 554, 600, 601, 624) came from the Portuguese Air Force. The aircraft were all painted in the colours of No. 56 Squadron RAF and were based at RAF Kenley during the filming. The Squadron letters of No. 56 Squadron were ‘US’. A number of Hurricanes seen in the film carried the squadron letters 'AV' which were the letters of No. 121, the second American Eagle squadron.  Other RAF types seen in the background include North American Harvard training aircraft, Avro Anson and Supermarine Spitfire. The enemy aircraft were represented by a captured Messerschmitt Bf 110 G4 from the "German Force Aircraft Equipment Centre", Stanmore Park. It was scrapped after filming in 1952. Other enemy aircraft were depicted by models.

Ronald Adam who plays the part of a Group Controller was the Fighter Group Controller at RAF Hornchurch during the Battle of Britain. Squadron Leader Adam was a veteran of both the First and Second World Wars.

Music
The opening titles feature the Royal Air Force March Past composed by Sir Henry Walford Davies KCVO OBE.

Reception

Box office
Angels One Five was the ninth most popular at the British box office in 1952.

Critical response
Film critic Bosley Crowther, in his review for The New York Times, wrote that "there's something about any picture that recollects the R.A.F. and the triumphant Battle of Britain that this reviewer finds hard to resist. Maybe it's all those brave young pilots; maybe it's the climate of the operations rooms; maybe it's those Hurricanes and Spitfires barreling down the runways and clawing into the sky. The symbols of that kind of warfare and that phase of World War II are so heroically connected that they invariably stir a thrill. And one must say that this picture has a cast to do it proud."

Aviation film historian Stephen Pendo remarked, ""Septic" Baird (John Gregson) and "Tiger" Small (Jack Hawkins)... play their roles with a reasonable degree of expertise."

References

Notes

Bibliography

 Pendo, Stephen. Aviation in the Cinema. Lanham, Maryland: Scarecrow Press, 1985. .
 Quill, Jeffrey, Spitfire: A Test Pilot's Story. London: Crécy Publishing Ltd, 1998. .

External links
 
 

1952 films
1952 war films
British war films
British aviation films
Battle of Britain films
Films shot at Associated British Studios
Films directed by George More O'Ferrall
Royal Air Force mass media
British black-and-white films
1950s English-language films
1950s British films